Pierre Jaminet (Paris, 12 February 1912 — Le Havre, 7 December 1968) was a French professional road bicycle racer.

Major results

1938
Critérium International
1939
Tour de France:
Winner stages 10 and 16A

External links 

Official Tour de France results for Pierre Jaminet

French male cyclists
1912 births
1968 deaths
French Tour de France stage winners
Cyclists from Paris